Arthur Bramley (25 March 1929 – 10 January 2021) was an English professional footballer who played in the Football League for Mansfield Town.

He died in January 2021 at the age of 91.

References

1929 births
2021 deaths
Association football goalkeepers
English Football League players
English footballers
Mansfield Town F.C. players